The Actors' Gang is an experimental theatre and nonprofit group based at the Ivy Substation in Culver City, California. It was founded in 1981 by a group of actors, including Tim Robbins, now a member of the board and Artistic Director of the troupe. The group states its mission is "to create bold, original works for the stage and daring reinterpretations of the classics".

History
The Actors' Gang has produced over 150 plays in Los Angeles, in forty US states, and on five continents. The company was founded in 1981 by a group of young artists looking to build a theatre that would present relevant and vibrantly entertaining plays. Guided by Founding Artistic Director, Tim Robbins, the company provides a supportive environment for a diverse ensemble of artists and the development of their groundbreaking work.

The Actors' Gang has presented the work of innovative theater artists including Georges Bigot, Simon Abkarian, Charles Mee, David Schweizer, Bill Rauch and the Cornerstone Theatre Company, Tracy Young, Roger Guenver Smith, Eric Bogosian, Oskar Eustis, Danny Hoch, Beth Milles, Jon Kellam, Brian Kulick, Stefan Haves, Namaste Theater Company, Culture Clash, JR Reed, Michael Schlitt, and Tenacious D.

The Actors' Gang ensemble has included accomplished actors such as Jack Black, John Cusack, John C. Reilly, Helen Hunt, Kate Walsh, Fisher Stevens, Jeremy Piven, Ebbe Roe Smith, Jon Favreau, Lauren Lane, Brent Hinkley, Kate Mulligan, Lee Arenberg, Kyle Gass, and Tim Robbins.

Guest artists that have appeared on The Actors' Gang stage include: Jackson Browne, Sarah Silverman, Ben Gibbard, John Doe, Tom Morello, Jenny Lewis, Wayne Kramer, Paul Provenza, Zooey Deschanel, Serj Tankian, David Crosby, Felicity Huffman, Jill Sobule, William H. Macy, Phillip Baker Hall, Jeanne Tripplehorn, T.C. Boyle. and the late Gore Vidal.

Community outreach
The Actors' Gang Education and Outreach Program provides free after-school, in-school, and summer programs for Los Angeles County youth.  Company Actors/Teaching Artists work in collaboration with youth to create original ensemble theatre.  As a result, the kids and adults develop collaboration and communication skills while experiencing the benefits of creative self-expression.

The Actors' Gang Prison Project provides 8-week workshops in California prisons in order to unlock human potential in the interest of effective rehabilitation.  One of the few remaining arts programs inside California's correctional system, the Prison Project has a profound impact on inmates, their families, and prison staff.  Participants develop social skills, self-esteem, tools for life beyond bars.  Since the program's inception 8 years ago, the Prison Project maintains a 0% recidivism rate (California's rate exceeds 60%).

Other Community Outreach programs include weekly Pay-What-You-Can performances (every Thursday's performance during all production runs) and free Shakespeare-in-the-Park every weekend in August (a 45 minute Shakespeare adaptation for all ages).  The Actors' Gang contributes ticket vouchers for group trips and non-profit fundraising activities.

Productions
In 2014, the Actors' Gang toured its production of William Shakespeare's A Midsummer Night's Dream, directed by Tim Robbins.  The tour schedule included:

 Beijing - Centre for the Performing Arts, China, June 2014
 Shanghai - Daguan Theatre, Shanghai Zendai Himalayas Arts Centre, China, June 2014
 Spoleto - Spoleto Festival, Italy, July 2014
 Los Angeles - Ivy Substation (home of The Actors' Gang), California, USA, July and August 2014
 Nashville - OZ Arts, Tennessee, USA, September 2014
 Porto Alegre - Porto Alegre Em Cena, Brazil, September 2014
 
Other touring productions include George Orwell's 1984, Tartuffe, Embedded, The Trial of the Catonsville Nine, The Guys, and The Exonerated. These productions have toured 41 states in the U.S. and cities across the world from London to Athens, Madrid, Barcelona, Bogota, Hong Kong, Melbourne, and Buenos Aires, covering five continents.

Training
Actor training courses are held at the theater several times a year in 8-week periods.

The Style
The Style is a unique form of acting developed at the Actors' Gang over its many year history. It includes elements of commedia del arte, mask work, viewpoints, and focuses on developing emotional states. Every show at the Actors Gang utilizes the Style in varying degrees of subtlety.

References

External links

Performing groups established in 1981
Theatre companies in Los Angeles